Thore Heramb (29 December 1916 – 16 June 2014) was a Norwegian painter and illustrator. His art was inspired by impressionism and by cubism.  His artistic style is commonly described as colourist  and frequently featured abstracted landscapes.

Biography
He was born in Kristiania (now Oslo), Norway. He was the son of  Gustav Heramb (1886-1956) and   Signe Marie Michelsen (1891-1966). He was trained at the Norwegian National Academy of Craft and Art Industry  (1935-37) and at the Norwegian National Academy of Fine Arts under Jean Heiberg  (1939-1940). He debuted at the Høstutstillingen in  Oslo during 1938 and held his first solo exhibition at the Kunstnerforbundet in 1943.

He was awarded the Schäffers legat (1946),  Houens legat (1947) and Conrad Mohrs stip. (1951). He conducted study trips to Italy (1939),  Copenhagen (1946), Paris (1949) and Provence (1951-52).

Between 1947-1948, he performed the decorations for the Aker Town Hall (Akers herredshus). Located at  Trondheimsveien 5, 
the building features his motif Fossen, a designed inspired by the Akerselva which flows through Oslo. Among his other notable works are the painting Rød figur i blå sofa from 1950  and the triptykon Palestina-trio from 1973–79. The Norwegian Museum of Contemporary Art has acquired twenty of his works. He is represented at the  National Gallery in Oslo as well as at Bergen Billedgalleri, Trondheim Kunstmuseum, Llllehamrner Kunstmuseurn and  Rogaland Kunstmuseum. Internationally his work is featured at the National Gallery of Denmark,  Gothenburg Museum of Art and Stockholm City Museum.

Personal life
Thore Heramb was married twice. He first married Ellen Schiøtz (1918–1942). Following her death, he married Randi Synnøve Eriksen in 1944.

Selected works
 Pont d'Arcole (1952)  National Gallery 
Vinterkveld i Oslo (1965) National Gallery 
Bjørkeskog (1967) National Gallery 
Huldreberget (1972) National Gallery 
Krattskog (1981) National Museum of Art, Architecture and Design

References

Related reading
Heramb, Thore (2006) Thore Heramb (Oslo:  Labyrinth Press)    

1916 births
2014 deaths
Oslo National Academy of the Arts alumni
Artists from Oslo
Norwegian painters
Norwegian illustrators
Norwegian Impressionist painters